Persibom, or its full name Perserikatan Sepakbola Indonesia Bolaang Mongondow, is an Indonesian football club based in Bolaang Mongondow Regency, North Sulawesi. They currently compete in the Liga 3 and their homeground is Ambang Stadium.

History
Persibom started their work in the world of national football from the lower caste, namely the 2002 Liga Indonesia Second Division. However, this season, they have not been able to move up the caste even though they managed to penetrate the Final Round. In the early stages, Persibom won Group F and advanced to the Round of 12. Their progress has stalled in this round and only ranks third in Group M behind Persid Jember and Persibo Bojonegoro.

In the 2003 season, In the Round of 12, Persibom joined Group L and became hosted in the Ambang Stadium. they managed to become group winners with a score of seven points from three matches. In the Big 4 Final Round, Persibom was only runner-up to Persekabpas Pasuruan. Both clubs are also entitled to promotion to Liga Indonesia First Division for next season along with two other clubs, PS Mitra Kukar and Persigo Gorontalo.

International players
 Sahari Gultom
 Fandy Mochtar
 Ricky Akbar Ohorella
 Amir Yusuf Pohan
 Listiyanto Raharjo
 Alexis Tibidi
 Francis Wewengkang

References

 
Football clubs in Indonesia
Football clubs in North Sulawesi
Association football clubs established in 1986
1986 establishments in Indonesia